Birmingham Pride is a weekend-long LGBTQ+ festival held annually in the Gay Village, Hurst Street, Birmingham, England, over the Spring Bank Holiday weekend. Birmingham Pride is the UK's largest two-day gay pride festival.

It usually features a carnival parade through the city centre (but the 2008 parade was cancelled), plus dance and musical events, funfair rides, a temporary village green, and street stalls and entertainments.

History
The first Birmingham Gay Pride Weekend took place on 8–9 July 1977, one week after the first London Gay Pride Week, itself the first Gay Pride Rally to take place outside the United States. Although "hastily arranged and not very well conceived", the Birmingham event featured dances, two "Gay Days" in Cannon Hill Park and a march up New Street from the Bull Ring, culminating in a small rally on the steps of Birmingham Town Hall. According to one of its organisers "Our aim was to announce ourselves and let Birmingham know gay people were here: ‘Here we are and here we’ll stay’" Two or three further such events were organised by Birmingham Gay Liberation Front until the organisation declined in the mid 1970s.

Annual gay festivals in Birmingham resumed in 1983 with the first "Five Days of Fun", originally known as "Gay Brum". Unlike the 1970s Pride weekends and the earlier "Gay Days", Five Days of Fun was not intended as a political statement but as a social event and celebration. Daytime and evening events would take place throughout the city's main gay bars and clubs in the village – culminating in an It's a Knockout competition between teams of the venues' staff, held in the garden/swimming pool at The Grosvenor House Hotel, Hagley Road, Edgbaston.

See also

Birmingham Gay Village
List of LGBT events

References

Bibliography

External links
Birmingham Pride Official Site
Birmingham Pride 2009 - BBC Birmingham, May 2009
Views on Birmingham Pride - BBC Birmingham, 2008
Pride - The Real Rainbow - BBC Birmingham, 2005
Birmingham's Gay Village - BBC Birmingham
The Gay Directory - Birmingham Pride

Festivals in Birmingham, West Midlands
Community organisations in Birmingham, West Midlands
Pride parades in England
1972 establishments in England
Recurring events established in 1972
LGBT culture in Birmingham, West Midlands
Spring (season) events in England